Drone Dome is a counter unmanned air system (C-UAS) anti-aircraft system developed by Israel-based miltech Rafael Advanced Defense Systems. The system was first displayed in 2016, and joins similar protection systems developed by Rafael such as the Iron Dome. 

The Drone Dome hosts different sensors including a RADA Electronic Industries RPS-42 radar, a CONTROP Precision Technologies imaging system, and radio signal detectors.

The Drone Dome was thought to have been used during the disruption at Gatwick Airport during December 2018.

The system was reported to have been deployed in Argentina during the 2018 G20 Buenos Aires summit and the 2018 Summer Youth Olympics in Buenos Aires.

In 2022, Greece started actively using Drone Dome as a measuere to counter Turkey's military activities with the usage of drones.

References

Counter unmanned air system
Israeli inventions
Rafael Advanced Defense Systems
Weapons countermeasures
Military equipment introduced in the 2010s